The Coral Sea gregory, Stegastes gascoynei, is a damselfish of the family Pomacentridae  in the western Pacific Ocean at depths between 1 and 30 m.  Its length is up to 15 cm. The specific name commemorates the Royal Australian Navy  , from which the type specimen was collected.

References

Stegastes